Codonopsis subscaposa is a herbaceous member of the family Campanulaceae, native to west Sichuan and north-west Yunnan in China.

References

Campanuloideae
Flora of South-Central China